The 27th National Geographic Bee was held on May 11–13, 2015 in Washington, District of Columbia. It is sponsored by the National Geographic Society.  Soledad O'Brien was the host for the second and final time. The winner was Karan Menon of John Adams Middle School in Edison, New Jersey, who won $50,000 in scholarships, a trip for 2 to the Galapagos Islands, and a lifetime membership to the National Geographic Society. The runner-up was Shriya Yarlagadda of Grand Blanc East Middle School in Grand Blanc, Michigan who won a $25,000 scholarship. The Third place winner was Sojas Wagle of Springdale, Arkansas, who won $10,000 in scholarships. Finishing in 4th place was Tejas Badgujar of Pennsylvania. The competition started with the school level rounds, in which more than 5 million students competed in 11,000 schools across the nation. Other students who placed in the top ten include Kapil Nathan of Alabama, Nicholas Monahan of Idaho, Patrick Taylor of Iowa, Abhinav Karthikeyan of Maryland, Lucy Chae of Massachusetts, and Shreyas Varathan of Minnesota. The Florida State Champion, Rishi Nair, became the 2016 National Geographic Bee Champion.  The winners of the school bees then took a written qualification test to see who could qualify for the state level competition. The top 100 or so scorers on the qualification test in each state were selected to go for the state championship. The winners of the state championship would then get $100 in cash, a National Geographic 10th Edition Atlas, and the opportunity to represent their state in the National Finals held in Washington, DC.

2015 state representatives
The state representatives from each of the 50 U.S. states, Atlantic territories, Pacific territories, and Department of Defense dependents schools was determined on March 27, 2015 at the state level competitions.

Final round
The 10 Finalists in this year's Final round were Nicholas Monahan from Idaho, Karan Menon from New Jersey, Sojas Wagle from Arkansas, Abhinav Karthikeyan from Maryland, Patrick Taylor from Iowa, Lucy Chae from Massachusetts, Kapil Nathan from Alabama, Shreyas Varathan from Minnesota, Shriya Yarlagadda from Michigan, and Tejas Badgujar from Pennsylvania. This years finals had many new changes including a 45-second oral response, a series of 3 questions asked at the US Botanical Gardens, and lightning rounds, where a finalist would get 3 questions in a row, with only 6 seconds to answer each. In one of these rounds, Karan, the state champion of New Jersey was asked "The Mesabi range contains a large deposit of what metal-bearing mineral?" Karan's answer of taconite was originally marked wrong (the given answer was iron ore), but later he would object and prove to the judges that his answer was correct. Shriya Yarlagadda, from Michigan maintained a perfect score throughout most of the competition. In the end, the top 2 students were Karan of New Jersey and Shriya of Michigan. Karan got a perfect score of 7/7 in the championship round, while Shriya only missed the first question. "Mariupol, a city located at the mouth of the Kalmius River, is located on what sea that is an arm of the Black Sea?" Answer: "Sea of Azov." The final question that clinched the win for Karan was "If completed, the proposed Grand Inga Dam would become the world’s largest hydropower plant. This dam would be built near Inga Falls on which African river?" Answer: "Congo River." The Third place winner was Sojas Wagle of Springdale, Arkansas, who won $10,000 in scholarships. Finishing in 4th place was Tejas Badgujar of Allison Park, Pennsylvania.

References

2015 in Washington, D.C.
2015 in education
National Geographic Bee